Asemnantha was a monotypic genus of flowering plants in the family Rubiaceae but is no longer recognized. The genus contained only one species, i.e. Asemnantha pubescens, which is found from Mexico to Central America. It was sunk into synonymy with Chiococca.

References

External links 
 World Checklist of Rubiaceae

Monotypic Rubiaceae genera
Chiococceae
Historically recognized Rubiaceae genera
Taxa named by Joseph Dalton Hooker